Richard D. Moroso, commonly called “Dick”, was an American hot rodder, drag racer, and businessman.

Moroso grew up in Old Greenwich CT and started selling speed parts out of his family's basement in the early 1960s under the name Speed Associates. In the mid 1960s, Moroso and then partner Hank Dietrich opened Performance Automotive in Stamford CT.

Moroso founded Moroso Performance Products, to supply aftermarket automotive parts to fellow hot rodders, in 1968, the year his son, Rob, was born. 

He served as son Rob's owner and sponsor for much of his racing career.

Driving a 1961 Corvette, Moroso won one NHRA national title, in D/MP (D Modified Production), at the 1966 NHRA Nationals, held at Indianapolis Raceway Park.

In 1981, Moroso purchased Palm Beach International Raceway, renaming it Moroso Motorsports Park. In 1982, Moroso spent $100,000 to upgrade the facility to host the opening event of the 1983 SCCA Trans Am Series.

In 1996, Moroso considered spending $2 million on a one-mile oval track for stock car racing, but those plans fell through.

Moroso died from brain cancer in 1998.

Family
Moroso had a son, Rob, who raced in NASCAR before he was killed while driving at more than twice the blood/alcohol limit in 1990. Dick had other children, Rick, who currently runs the company, and a daughter, Susan.

Notes

Sources
Davis, Larry. Gasser Wars, North Branch, MN: Cartech, 2003, p.185.

Dragster drivers
American racing drivers
1998 deaths
 Year of birth missing